Wiedeman is a surname. Notable people with the surname include:

Andrew Wiedeman (born 1989), American soccer player
John Wiedeman, American broadcaster

See also
Wideman
Wiedemann
Weideman
Weidemann